March is the fourth studio album by English-American singer-songwriter Lene Lovich, released in October 1989 by Pathfinder Records. It was her first new full-length album since No Man's Land (1982) and also the last album before her 15-year hiatus and the release of Shadows and Dust (2005). The album is entirely produced by Lovich and Les Chappell. They also wrote all the songs on the album, except for "Wonderland", which was co-written by Andy Scott and Chris Bradford. It was recorded in Norfolk, England.

The lead single "Wonderland" was released in 1988 and reached number 25 on the Billboard Hot Dance Club Songs. "Make Believe" was released in April 1990 as a promotional single accompanied by a music video.

March received mixed reviews from the music critics.

Track listings

Personnel

Personnel
Lene Lovich – vocals, saxophone, trumpet, violin
Les Chappell – multi-instruments, vocals
Mark Heyward-Chaplin – bass on "Nightshift", "Vertigo" and "Sharman"
Gavin Harrison – percussion on "Vertigo"

Design
Patrick Roques – art direction
Josef Astor – photography

Production
Douglas Lichterman – executive producer
Tom Milmore – executive producer
Mark Reynolds – assistant engineer
Mark Gilbert – assistant engineer

Credits adapted from the album's liner notes.

References

External links
[ March] at AllMusic

Lene Lovich albums
1989 albums
Justin Time Records albums